Phorocera is a genus of flies in the family Tachinidae.

Species
P. aequalis (Reinhard, 1935)
P. angustiforceps Wood, 1972
P. assimilis (Fallén, 1810)
P. atricans Tschorsnig, 1992
P. auriceps Wood, 1972
P. compascua (Reinhard, 1935)
P. convexa Wood, 1972
P. exigua Wood, 1972
P. grandis (Rondani, 1859)
P. liaoningensis Yao & Zhang, 2009
P. normalis Chao, 1964
P. obscura (Fallén, 1810)
P. slossonae (Townsend, 1908)
P. webberi (Smith, 1917)

References

Diptera of Europe
Diptera of North America
Exoristinae
Tachinidae genera
Taxa named by Jean-Baptiste Robineau-Desvoidy